Scream of Stone is a 1991 film directed by Werner Herzog about a climbing expedition on Cerro Torre. The film was shot on location at Cerro Torre, with several scenes filmed close to the summit.

The script was written principally by longtime Herzog production manager Walter Saxer, based on an idea from mountaineer Reinhold Messner, whom Herzog had worked with in his documentary The Dark Glow of the Mountains. Herzog, who usually writes his own screenplays, believes that the script was weak, especially the dialogue, and says that he does not consider Scream of Stone to be his film. He would not direct another feature film for ten years.

The film has elements drawn from the history of the supposed first conquest of the summit of Cerro Torre in 1959, by the Italian climber Cesare Maestri and his partner, the Austrian Toni Egger, who died during the descent.

References

External links

 
 

1991 films
1990s adventure drama films
German adventure drama films
English-language German films
Mountaineering films
Films directed by Werner Herzog
Films set in Argentina
Films set in Chile
Films shot in Argentina
Films shot in Chile
1991 drama films
1990s English-language films
1990s German films